Savage Nunatak is a nunatak located 7 nautical miles (13 km) southeast of Hatcher Bluffs, along the east margin of upper Reedy Glacier. Mapped by the United States Geological Survey (USGS) from surveys and U.S. Navy air photos, 1960–64. Named by Advisory Committee on Antarctic Names (US-ACAN) for Henry C. Savage, builder at Byrd Station in 1962.

Nunataks of Marie Byrd Land